Professor Lawrence Peter Ormerod FRCP, FRCP(Edin), FRCP(Glas) (born 1950) was an English chest physician.

Ormerod was educated at Bacup and Rawtenstall Grammar School. He qualified as a doctor in 1974 and gained a DSc in 2000 for his work researching tuberculosis.

He is a Professor of Respiratory Medicine at the University of Manchester and at the University of Central Lancashire, and was a consultant for BMI Healthcare at the Beardwood Hospital in Lancashire.

He was appointed to the Joint Tuberculosis Committee in 1987 and served as its chair from 1995 to 2000. He was a consultant adviser on Tuberculosis to the United Kingdom Government's Department of Health, from 1997 to 2003.

He was President of the British Thoracic Society for the year 2008–2009.

References

External links 

20th-century English medical doctors
21st-century English medical doctors
People educated at Bacup and Rawtenstall Grammar School
Academics of the University of Manchester
Academics of the University of Central Lancashire
Fellows of the Royal College of Physicians
Fellows of the Royal College of Physicians of Edinburgh
Fellows of the Royal College of Physicians and Surgeons of Glasgow
1950 births
Living people
Place of birth missing (living people)
British pulmonologists
20th-century surgeons